Smaragdis is a Greek surname. Notable people with the surname include:

Nikolaos Smaragdis (born 1982), Greek volleyball player
Paris Smaragdis, American engineer
Yannis Smaragdis (born 1946), Greek filmmaker

Greek-language surnames